Karl August "Heinrich" Peter (born 13 June 1910; date of death unknown) was a German field hockey player who competed in the 1936 Summer Olympics.  He was a member of the German field hockey team, which won the silver medal. He played one match as halfback.

External links
 
profile

1910 births
Year of death missing
Field hockey players at the 1936 Summer Olympics
German male field hockey players
Olympic field hockey players of Germany
Olympic silver medalists for Germany
Olympic medalists in field hockey
Medalists at the 1936 Summer Olympics